The Aspen Center for Physics is a non-profit Center for research in Physics based in Aspen, Colorado, United States. The Center organizes workshops and conferences to facilitate interactions among research physicists.

The Center was founded in 1962 by Purdue University postdoctoral fellow George Stranahan (later known for owning-operating the Flying Dog cattle ranch and co-founding the Flying Dog Brewery), University of Pennsylvania professor Michael Cohen and Aspen Institute director Robert W. Craig. While working on his doctoral dissertation at the Carnegie Institute of Technology in 1957, Stranahan first moved to Aspen, where he enjoyed the mountainous surroundings and fishing. Following this experience, he was motivated to establish the center as a retreat for physicists.

Program
During the Summer Program, late–May through mid–September, the Center provides individual researchers and small working groups with double offices and campus activities for over 500 leading scientists. Ten to thirteen informal workshops of two– to five–weeks in the areas of biophysics, astrophysics and cosmology, particle physics, and condensed matter physics are also scheduled, but the most important aspect of attendance is the cross–fertilization of ideas that spontaneously arises during one–on–one conversations and across fields. Participants include post–doctoral fellows, professors, researchers and experimentalists. More than sixty of the Nobel Prize recipients in physics have participated in Aspen. Housing expenses are partially underwritten by the National Science Foundation. Families often accompany participants.

The Winter Conferences in January, February and March consist of specific and intensive week long conferences. Each week, fifty to a hundred participants meet daily for talks at the Center, share a block of hotel rooms and eat meals together, totally immersing in the subject of study.

Outreach
The Center offers free public lectures during both summer and winter sessions, bringing cutting–edge research to the interested non–scientist.  With the Aspen Science Center, the Aspen Center for Physics also hosts summer barbecues for local and visiting youth who come with their families to picnic and hear an entertaining and informative physics talk. The Physics Cafe held before the winter lectures offers students and adults an opportunity to talk informally with physicists.
The Center also hosts conversational dialogues, conducts interviews on local access television (Grassrootstv.org “Physics Preview”) and radio (″Radio Physics″ with high school students on KDNK), offers opportunities for high school physics students to engage with participants, and provides a science resource for schools and youth organizations.

References

Aspen, Colorado
Physics institutes
1962 establishments in Colorado
Theoretical physics institutes